Langerhans may refer to:

 Paul Langerhans (1847–1888), German pathologist and biologist
Langerhans cells, dendritic cells abundant in the epidermis
Islets of Langerhans, the area in which the endocrine cells of the pancreas are grouped
 Ryan Langerhans (born 1980), American baseball player